Jimmy Estacio is a Colombian footballer that plays for Expreso Rojo.

He can play as a central defender and is a starter.

He played with the Colombia national under-20 football team at the 2005 South American Youth Championship, which Colombia hosted and won. He then competed at the 2005 FIFA World Youth Championship in the Netherlands, helping Colombia to the Round of 16 before losing to eventual champion Argentina.

References

External links
 BDFA profile

1986 births
Living people
Colombian footballers
Colombia under-20 international footballers
Categoría Primera A players
Deportivo Cali footballers
Deportivo Pereira footballers
Once Caldas footballers
Deportivo Pasto footballers
Tigres F.C. footballers
Association football defenders
Footballers from Cali